The Sumatran wren-babbler (Napothera albostriata) is a species of bird in the family Pellorneidae. It is endemic to western Sumatra. Its natural habitat is subtropical or tropical moist montane forest.

References

 Collar, N. J. & Robson, C. 2007. Family Timaliidae (Babblers)  pp. 70–291 in; del Hoyo, J., Elliott, A. & Christie, D.A. eds. Handbook of the Birds of the World, Vol. 12. Picathartes to Tits and Chickadees. Lynx Edicions, Barcelona.

Birds of Sumatra
Sumatran wren-babbler
Napothera
Taxobox binomials not recognized by IUCN